The Faculty of Medicine, Mahasarakham University is a medical school in Northeastern Thailand located in Mueang Maha Sarakham District, Maha Sarakham Province.

History 
The Faculty of Medicine, Mahasarakham University was founded as a sub-division of the university, following a university council meeting on 21 November 2003. Initially, it was located at the Kham Riang Campus (New Campus), and a  medical service center was opened on 1 July 2004. In November 2005, the faculty was moved to the Downtown Campus (Old Campus). and another medical service center was opened at this campus on 6 February 2006. In 2006, the medical course was approved by the Medical Council of Thailand and thus the faculty admitted the first cohort of medical students for the 2006 academic year. On 6 June 2014, Suddhavej Hospital opened and was used as the main teaching hospital instead of the Downtown Medical Center.

Education 
The faculty currently provides education for 5 courses:

 Doctor of Medicine (MD)
 Bachelor of Applied Thai Traditional Medicine
 BSc. in Emergency Healthcare
 MSc. in Health Science
 Ph.D. in Health Science

Teaching Hospitals 
Main

 Suddhavej Hospital

MD Affiliates

 Kalasin Hospital (CPIRD)
 Roi Et Hospital (CPIRD)

BSc. Emergency Healthcare Affiliates

 Maharat Nakhon Ratchasima Hospital

See also 

 List of medical schools in Thailand

References 

 Article incorporates material from the corresponding article in the Thai Wikipedia.

Mahasarakham University
University departments in Thailand
Medical schools in Thailand